Wickler is a German surname. Notable people with the surname include:
Clemens Wickler (born 1995), German beach volleyball player
Wolfgang Wickler (born 1931), German zoologist, behavioral researcher, and publicist

Hans-Heinrich Winkler (born 1954), East German luger, whose name is alternatively spelled as Wickler

See also
Wicker (surname)
Winckler

German-language surnames